The 2015 Tippeligaen was the 71st completed season of top-tier football in Norway. The competition began on 6 April 2015, one week later than in the previous season.  A short summer-break in June was scheduled between the rounds played on 12 July and 26 July, and the decisive match was played on 8 November 2015. Molde were the defending champions. Sandefjord, Tromsø and Mjøndalen joined as the promoted clubs from the 2014 1. divisjon. They replaced Brann, Sogndal and Sandnes Ulf who were relegated to the 2015 1. divisjon.

Teams
The league was contested by 16 teams: the 13 best teams of the 2014 season; the two teams who won direct promotion from the 2014 1. divisjon, Sandefjord and Tromsø; and Mjøndalen, who won the promotion/relegation play-off finals against Brann.

Stadia and locations

Note: Table lists in alphabetical order.

Personnel and kits

Managerial changes

League table

Positions by round

Relegation play-offs

Final

The 14th-placed team, Start, took part in a two-legged play-off against Jerv, the winners of the 2015 1. divisjon promotion play-offs, to decide who would play in the 2016 Tippeligaen.

Start won 4–2 on aggregate and retained their place in the 2016 Tippeligaen; Jerv remained in the 1. divisjon.

Results

Season statistics

Top scorers

Hat-tricks

Notes
4 Player scored 4 goals(H) – Home team(A) – Away team

Top assists

Discipline

Player
Most yellow cards: 8
 Michael Christensen (Start)
Most red cards: 1
25 players

Club
Most yellow cards: 52  
Sandefjord

Most red cards: 3
Lillestrøm
Molde

Attendances

Awards

Annual awards

References 

Eliteserien seasons
1
Norway
Norway